This article includes a list of 57 member states of the Organisation of Islamic Cooperation sorted by their exports.

Notes

See also
 Organisation of Islamic Cooperation
 Economy of the Organisation of Islamic Cooperation
 List of Organisation of Islamic Cooperation member states by GDP (PPP)
 List of Organisation of Islamic Cooperation member states by GDP per capita (PPP)
 List of Organisation of Islamic Cooperation member states by imports

Exports
Organisation of Islamic Cooperation-related lists